M1897 can refer to:

 Canon de 75 modèle 1897, a field gun (also 75 mm gun M1897 in US service)
 5-inch gun M1897, a US coast artillery gun
 6-inch gun M1897, a US coast artillery gun
 Winchester Model 1897, a shotgun 
 Webley-pocket M1897, a revolver